The 53rd season of the Irish television programme, The Late Late Show, the world's longest-running chat show, began on 5 September 2014 and is expected to conclude in May 2015. Ryan Tubridy's sixth season as host, it airs on RTÉ One each Friday evening from 21:30.

Local guests this season included Bosco, Bono and The Edge, Tánaiste Joan Burton, Alan Shatter (months after his resignation as minister for justice), Des O'Malley, Francis Brennan, Liz O'Donnell, Micheál Martin and Dustin the Turkey. A panel debate on Irish Water in October was followed by an interview with Anti-Austerity Alliance TD Paul Murphy in February, after which Tubridy's style of questioning came in for much criticism. A trio of Gleesons (Brendan, Domhnall and Brian) were interviewed on the same night in December.

International guests interviewed this season included Eva Longoria, Alan Rickman, Dominic West, Ryan O'Neal, Russell Crowe and Richard E. Grant (the latter alongside Gabriel Byrne). English actors Michael Palin and John Cleese, both of the comedy troupe Monty Python, were interviewed over consecutive episodes in December.

The season closed with a dance special and a tribute by Giles, Brady and Dunphy to Bill O'Herlihy after his death earlier that week.

Sponsorship
Sky Broadband sponsored the show for a second year.

Declining audience ratings
Audience ratings declined considerably (at one point even The Saturday Night Show attracted more viewers).

Sinéad O'Connor
The singer used her appearance this season (21 November edition) to call for non-violent revolution. She did so from Tubridy's chair, having convinced him to swap places with her.

Paul Murphy interview
On 20 February 2015, Tubridy interviewed Anti-Austerity Alliance TD Paul Murphy in relation to the campaign against the implementation of a water tax. The interview proved frustrating, with many expressing annoyance at the tone and some of the questions asked. Opponents of the water tax praised Murphy on social media for what was said to have been his restraint during the interview. Much commentary was critical of Tubridy. Murphy himself described his encounter with Tubridy as "an exercise in badgering and trying to make me responsible for things that are nothing to do with me", a reference to Tubridy's attempts to link him to a protests against President Michael D. Higgins which he said he had nothing to do with. Julien Mercille, the academic and writer of The Political Economy and Media Coverage of the European Economic Crisis: The Case of Ireland, observed that "Tubridy was pretty good from the standpoint of protecting government interests. [...] He asked all the right questions to try to discredit the water charges protests and Paul Murphy".

 http://www.independent.ie/entertainment/television/ryan-oneal-interview-shocks-crowe-and-late-late-viewers-31085447.html

Special editions
The Late Late Toy Show took place on 28 November.	

A Valentine's Day edition aired on 13 February 2015 attracted an extraordinary number of complaints. One of the show's guests, Ronan O'Gara, even talked about "getting up on Jessica"; Tubridy covered his mouth in shock upon hearing this vulgarity. O'Gara later admitted he had drunk two coffees and nothing else before the interview.

Eurosong took place on 27 February 2015.

The final episode of the season was a charity dancing special. It did, however, manage to work in a tribute by Giles, Brady and Dunphy to Bill O'Herlihy after his death earlier that week (others like George Hamilton and Après Matchs Risteárd Cooper were spoken to as members of the audience).

Episode list

References

External links
Official website

2014 Irish television seasons
2015 Irish television seasons
The Late Late Show (Irish talk show) seasons